Cafundó may refer to:

 Cafundó language
 Cafundó River
 Cafundó (film), a 2005 Brazilian historical drama film starring Lázaro Ramos.